Farnworth is a town in the Metropolitan Borough of Bolton, Greater Manchester, England,   southeast of Bolton, 4.3 miles south-west of Bury (7 km), and  northwest of Manchester.

Within the Historic County Boundaries of Lancashire, Farnworth lies on the River Irwell and River Croal. At the 2011 Census, it had a population of 26,939.

History

Toponymy
Farnworth derives from the Old English fearn, fern and worth an enclosure. Farnworth was recorded as Farneworth and Farnewrth in 1278 and 1279 and Ffornword in a land survey of 1282.

Middle Ages
Farnworth was originally a hamlet in Barton. In the 13th century it was held by the Lords of Barton and Manchester. By 1320 Adam Lever, Richard Hulton and Richard Redford held the manor as tenants. Later the manor was acquired by the Hultons of Over Hulton. In 1666 there were 91 hearths in Farnworth liable to pay tax. The commons were enclosed in 1798. There was a watermill on the River Croal.

Industrial Revolution
The town expanded rapidly in the 18th and 19th centuries around the coal mining industry. The collieries were part of an extensive mine complex, the Worsley Navigable Levels whose underground canals stretched from the Delph at Worsley and linked the mines to the Bridgewater Canal. Other industry included iron foundries and cotton mills.

The owner of Farnworth Paper mills, T. B. Crompton, patented a continuous-drying process which contributed to the mechanisation of papermaking in 1821.

The adjoining open land of Halshaw Moor became an area for recreation for the town, hosting the annual Halshaw Moor Wakes that were described as

Governance
Lying within the boundaries of Lancashire since the early 12th century, Farnworth constituted a township and chapelry within the ecclesiastical parish of Deane. In 1837 Farnworth became part of the Bolton Poor Law Union which took responsibility for funding the Poor Law in that area. In 1863, a Local board of health was established for the township, and in 1866, it also became a separate civil parish. In 1899, under the Local Government Act 1894, Farnworth became an Urban District. In 1939, the district was granted by a charter to become the Municipal Borough of Farnworth. In 1974, under the Local Government Act 1972, the municipal borough was abolished and its area became an unparished area of the Metropolitan Borough of Bolton in Greater Manchester. Farnworth has two of Bolton Council's 20 wards, which each are represented by three councillors. At first, the wards were called Farnworth North and Farnworth South, but following name and boundary changes in 1980 the eastern side of the town is covered by the Farnworth ward and the western half side is covered by the Harper Green ward.

Under the Redistribution of Seats Act 1885, the Radcliffe-cum-Farnworth constituency was established with one Member of Parliament (MP). The constituency was abolished in 1918 with Radcliffe becoming part of the Heywood and Radcliffe constituency, and Farnworth having its own Parliament constituency. The Farnworth constituency continued until it was abolished in 1983 and became part of the Bolton South East constituency.

Geography
Will Hill Brook forms the northern boundary. The underlying rocks are the coal measures of the Manchester Coalfield. Districts in Farnworth include Dixon Green and New Bury. The town has grown along the Manchester to Bolton road, the A666 and the A575 road to Worsley and Eccles. Plodder Lane, the B6199, goes west past the Royal Bolton Hospital.

Demography

At the 2011 UK census, the usual resident population for Farnworth had 26,939 inhabitants, of which 13,155 (48.8%) were male and 13,784 (51.2%) were female. The 2011 census recorded a total of 11,961 dwellings in Farnworth, of which were 663 detached houses, 5,345 semi-detached houses, 3,982 terraced houses, 1,701 purpose-built flats, 168 in part of a converted or shared house (including bedsits), 102 in a commercial building, and 19 caravans (or other mobile or temporary structure).

Population change

Community facilities

Farnworth's Carnegie Library on Market Street is one of the many Carnegie libraries in Europe established by the industrialist and philanthropist Andrew Carnegie. The library was built in 1911 and is constructed of red brick with ashlar sandstone dressings, and flat roofed areas surrounding a central dome. It was designated as a Grade II listed building on 29 September 1999 and celebrated its centenary on 11 April 2011.

Farnworth Little Theatre, established in 1948, is an amateur theatre group and is situated on Cross Street.

The town has two leisure centres. The first is Farnworth Leisure Centre with a swimming pool and is located on Brackley Street. The second one is Harper Green Community Leisure Centre and is located on Harper Green Road.

Farnworth has a number of parks and recreation grounds. The largest is Farnworth Park, close to the town centre, has undergone redevelopment as part of Bolton Council's Children's Strategy. There is also Ellesmere Park on the west side of the town centre, Bradford Street Recreation Ground in New Bury, and Doe Hey Playing Fields in Harper Green.

Royal Bolton Hospital (formerly known as the Fishpool Institution, Townleys Hospital, and Bolton General Hospital) is in Farnworth. An Emergency Department was added when Bolton Royal Infirmary in Bolton closed in the early 1990s and moved to the Farnworth site.

St Gregory's Catholic Club in Farnworth was used to film television comedy Phoenix Nights.

Transport
Farnworth is north of junctions 3 and 4 of the M61 motorway. The main roads run through the town are the A666 (Farnworth and Kearsley By-Pass), the A575 (Egerton St/Albert Rd/Worsley Rd), the A5082 (Buckley Lane/Long Causeway), the A6053 (Bolton Rd/Market St/Manchester Rd), and the B6199 (Plodder Lane).

Farnworth and Moses Gate railway stations are served by Northern which operates services on the Manchester to Preston Line.

Education

Farnworth has nine primary schools and three secondary schools. Harper Green School is home to the Alan Ball Sports Hall, as well as the Peter Kay Theatre. In 2006, Peter Kay filmed a music video at Harper Green with the Scottish band Texas.

Religious sites

The Anglican Diocese of Manchester has three active places of worship in Farnworth. The oldest is the Parish Church of St John the Evangelist on Church Street and was consecrated in 1826. The two other active Anglican churches in Farnworth are St Catharine's LEP Church, Highfield Road, Dixon Green, which is shared with the Methodist Church, and St George's Church, Daisy Avenue, just off Plodder Lane.

There had been other Anglican churches in the town but have closed: St Thomas' Church, Church Walk, Dixon Green, opened in 1878 and closed in 1996 but reopened by Farnworth Christian Fellowship in 2008; All Saints' Church, Moses Gate, opened in 1909 and closed ; St Peter's Church, Bradford Street, New Bury, opened in 1886, closed in 2007, and demolished in 2012; St James' Church, New Bury, opened in 1864/5 and closed in 2013.

The Roman Catholic Diocese of Salford has only one church in Farnworth, Our Lady of Lourdes' Church on Plodder Lane. There had been another, St Gregory the Great's Church on Presto Street, but it closed in 2004.

Other Christian places of worship in the town include Farnworth Christian Fellowship on Church Walk, Trinity Methodist Church on Market Street, Farnworth Baptist Church on Trafford Street, the United Reformed Church on Albert Road, and the Salvation Army Citadel on Brackley Street.
 	
The Sughra Mosque on Granville Street, the only mosque in Farnworth, serves the Muslim community.

Sports
Farnworth F.C. is a youth football that plays its home games at Darley Park, with winter training taking place at Harper Green School.

Farnworth Cricket Club, founded in 1870, plays its home games at Bridgeman Park. It participates in the Bolton Cricket League, as do Farnworth Social Circle.

Farnworth's Harper Green playing field also hosts the home games of Bolton Hockey Club men's section.

See also

Listed buildings in Farnworth

References

Bibliography

Further reading

External links

 Photos and information about Farnworth
 GENUKI: Farnworth genealogy
 St John the Evangelist church
 Farnworth Little Theatre
 Chairmen of Farnworth UDC and Mayors of Farnworth 1863
Finley13.^ October 2009+17:49:07 Comedy Tributes UK: Hylda Baker..Alan Ball. The Independent, Published: 26 April 2007. Archived 13 August 2007 at the Wayback Machine

 
Towns in Greater Manchester
Unparished areas in Greater Manchester
Geography of the Metropolitan Borough of Bolton